Robert (Roy) Charles Geary (April 11, 1896 – February 8, 1983) was an Irish statistician and founder of both the Central Statistics Office and the Economic and Social Research Institute. He held degrees from University College Dublin and the Sorbonne. He lectured in mathematics at University College Southampton (1922–23) and in applied economics at Cambridge University (1946–47).  He was a statistician in the Department of Industry and Commerce between 1923 and 1957. The National University of Ireland conferred a Doctorate of Science on him in 1938.  He was the founding director of the Central Statistics Office (Ireland) (in 1949). He was head of the National Accounts Branch of the United Nations in New York from 1957 to 1960. He was the founding director of the Economic and Social Research Institute (in 1960) where he stayed till his retirement in 1966. He was an honorary fellow of the American Statistical Association and the Institute of Mathematical Statistics. In 1981, he won the Boyle Medal. To honour his contributions to social sciences, the UCD Geary Institute for Public Policy was named after him in 2005.

Roy Geary is known for his contributions to the estimation of errors-in-variables models, Geary's C, the Geary–Khamis dollar, the Stone–Geary utility function, and Geary's theorem, which has that if the sample mean is distributed independently of the sample variance, then the population is distributed normally.

Works
 Europe's Future in Figures, North Holland (1962), ASIN: B002RB858E
 Elements of Linear Programming with Economic Applications (with J. E. Spencer), Lubrecht & Cramer Ltd (June 1973), 
 Exercises in Mathematical Economics and Econometrics, with Outlines of Theory (with J. E. Spencer), London: Charles Griffin & Co (1987),

References

External sources
 
 
 

1896 births
1983 deaths
20th-century Irish mathematicians
University of Paris alumni
Irish statisticians
Fellows of the Institute of Mathematical Statistics
20th-century Irish economists
Economic and Social Research Institute
Fellows of the American Statistical Association
Statistical and Social Inquiry Society of Ireland
Fellows of the Econometric Society
Irish expatriates in France